Dorcadion oezdurali is a species of beetle in the family Cerambycidae. It was described by Önalp in 1988. It is known from Turkey.

References

oezdurali
Beetles described in 1988